Banking and finance in Wales refers to the industries of banking and finance in Wales.

National banks 
The Development Bank of Wales is an investment bank that was founded by the Welsh Government. It invests in businesses, particularly start-ups by providing growth capital. 

Banc Cambria is a proposed Welsh community bank currently under development and aimed to be operating in Wales.

Other banks in Wales 
Hodge Bank is a bank named after Sir Julian Hodge. The bank was formed in 1987 as Julian Hodge Bank, and is headquartered in Cardiff, Wales.

Building societies 

The Swansea Building Society,, is an independent mutual building society based in Swansea, Wales. It is a member of the Building Societies Association.

The Principality Building Society is a building society based in Cardiff, Wales. With assets of £10bn it is the largest building society in Wales.

Monmouthshire Building Society,,  is a Welsh building society, which has its head office in Newport, South Wales. The Society provides a range of mortgage and savings products. A broad range of ancillary services, including insurance, financial planning, legal services and funeral plans are also provided by a number of other third-party companies.

Insurance 
Admiral Group plc is a Welsh financial services company headquartered in Cardiff, Wales. Listed on the London Stock Exchange, it is a constituent of the FTSE 100 Index, and markets the Admiral, Bell, Elephant, Diamond and Veygo vehicle insurance brands, as well as launching the price comparison services Confused.com and Compare.com. The group employs more than 10,000 people across its brands.

Thomas Carroll Group plc is a Welsh provider of business and personal insurance, financial management, health & safety and employment law consulting services.

References 

Economy of Wales